Khrlo e Romengo is a radio station, transmitting by satellite from Belgrade, Serbia, run by the Voice of Roma NGO, featuring programming in the Romani language.

References

Radio stations in Serbia
Romani in Serbia
Romani-language mass media
Romani mass media
Mass media in Belgrade